Acanthodela protophaes is a moth of the family Oecophoridae. It is found in Australia, including Tasmania.

References

External links
Acanthodela protophaes (Meyrick, 1883) Species in GBIF Backbone Taxonomy

Oecophorinae
Moths described in 1883